The Zegama-Aizkorri (also known a Zegama-Aizkorri Maratoia or Maratòn Alpina Zegama-Aizkorri) is an international skyrunning competition held for the first time in 2002. It runs every year in Spain from Zegama up to Aizkorri (1551 m MLS) and finish in Zegama (Basque Country) in May and consists of two races, a SkyMarathon (42.185 km) and from 2015 also a Vertical Kilometer both valid for the Skyrunner World Series.

Winners
All winners of marathon always disputed on the distance of 42.195 km.

* Fastest time

See also 
 Skyrunner World Series

References

External links 
 Official web site

Skyrunning competitions
Skyrunner World Series
Golden Trail Series
Athletics competitions in Spain
Sport in the Basque Country (autonomous community)